The Haunted House, also known as Haunted House, is a 1929 Mickey Mouse short animated film released by Celebrity Productions, as part of the Mickey Mouse film series. The cartoon was produced by Walt Disney Productions and distributed by Celebrity Productions. It was the fourteenth Mickey Mouse short to be produced, the eleventh of that year.

The film follows Mickey Mouse trapped in a haunted house and forced to play music. It was directed by Walt Disney who also provided the voice of Mickey; Ub Iwerks was the primary animator and Carl Stalling wrote the original music.

The Haunted House borrows animation from Disney's first Silly Symphony cartoon, The Skeleton Dance, which was released earlier in 1929, although most of the sequence is new. The Haunted House was Mickey's first cartoon with a horror theme and led the way to later films such as The Gorilla Mystery (1930) and The Mad Doctor (1933). Disney had some trouble with the state censors over this cartoon, because of the gags involving a chamber pot and an outhouse.

Plot
On a dark and stormy night, Mickey Mouse takes shelter in a house that he is passing and soon discovers that it is haunted. When Mickey enters the house, the door locks itself, before Mickey is startled by several bats appearing from cracks in the wall and a large spider descending from the ceiling, while hiding in a chamber pot. After climbing out of the chamber pot, Mickey then hears the sound of ghosts and flees into a hallway before the lights of a chandelier above go out. He lights a match, looks around, and finds a shadow of a cloaked figure appearing in his shadow. Mickey panics and flees in fright. The cloaked figure and several skeletons corner Mickey in a room, and compel him to play the organ while skeletons dance along to the music, one of them using a thermostat as an accordion. When the music stops, Mickey tries to escape, but runs into dead ends. He tries to open a door, but the door handle is actually a skeleton hand who shakes Mickey frantically. He runs up a staircase and bumps into two more skeletons in a bed. He finally falls out of a window and into a barrel full of skeletons, a skeleton that pops out from the door of an outhouse and Mickey runs away terrified.

Reception
On the 2004 Walt Disney Treasures DVD set Mickey Mouse in Black and White: Volume Two, The Haunted House is in the bonus-features "From the Vault" section, which begins with an introduction by film historian Leonard Maltin explaining the origins of racial stereotypes seen in Disney cartoons of the 30s and 40s. The Haunted House is included in that group because of Mickey's "Mammy!" impression, which refers to Al Jolson's famous blackface performance, "My Mammy". The 1931 short The Moose Hunt is also included in that section because of a similar gag featuring Pluto.

On the Disney Film Project, Ryan Kirkpatrick praises this short as a step forward in the series' sophistication: "The Haunted House breaks the formula of putting Mickey into a setting and having the music start immediately. Instead, it starts off with an establishing shot of the titular house, which looks like a menacing face on the horizon. Then we see Mickey struggling through a storm trying to reach the house. The music, the rain animation and the blowing wind that moves the objects in the foreground all help to give a sense of foreboding."

In his book Mickey's Movies: The Theatrical Films of Mickey Mouse, Gijs Grob disagrees: "Mickey's role in this short is limited, and his only function is as the carrier of the audience's fear. Indeed, he looks repeatedly into the camera for sympathy, dragging us into the haunted house with him. The early scenes of this cartoon manage to evoke a genuine feel of horror, but in the end the short resembles the boring song-and-dance routines of both the early Mickey Mouse and Silly Symphony series too much to be a standout."

Motion Picture News (January 4, 1930) said: "As the title indicates, a haunted house furnishes the background for this subject of the popular Mickey Mouse series. It has plenty of weird stuff capped by a burlesque of Al Jolson's Mammy line, that is a darb, and should bring down any house."

Film Daily (January 5, 1930) wrote: "The 'creeper' idea, as the title implies, injected into a Mickey Mouse comic, with the usual storm, lightning ghosts, dancing skeletons, etc. Also a flash simulation of Al Jolson, produced by a black-and-white character silhouette, with a simultaneous cry of 'Mammy,' that is a knockout."

Variety (February 12, 1930) said: "Another comedy wow. Joins Ub Iwerks' highly imaginative comedy conceptions with sound effects. Mickey Mouse in a haunted villa is fast with laughs throughout. Culminates in Mickey being compelled to play an eerie organ while a ballet of skeletons dance weird capers. Delightfully mad, this short can be added to any bill and improve it thereby."

Releases
1929 – Theatrical release
c. 1992 – Mickey's Mouse Tracks: Episode 25
1998 – The Ink & Paint Club: "Oooh! Scary!"

Home media
The short was released on December 7, 2004 on Walt Disney Treasures: Mickey Mouse in Black and White, Volume Two: 1929-1935.

Additional releases include:
1983 – Walt Disney Cartoon Classics: "Scary Tales" (VHS)

See also
Mickey Mouse (film series)

References

External links

The Haunted House at the Internet Animation Database

1929 short films
1920s Disney animated short films
1920s ghost films
Films directed by Walt Disney
Films produced by Walt Disney
Mickey Mouse short films
1929 horror films
American comedy horror films
American animated horror films
American horror short films
American haunted house films
American supernatural horror films
American black-and-white films
1929 animated films
American ghost films
Films scored by Carl Stalling
1920s comedy horror films
1929 comedy films
1920s English-language films
American animated short films
Animated films about mice
1920s American films